Ho Ying Fun (1921 – 21 October 2012) was a professional footballer and football manager. Born in Hong Kong, he represented Republic of China in 1948 Olympics and Republic of China (Taiwan) in 1954, 1958 Asian Games, as well as 1956 and 1960 AFC Asian Cup. Ho also represented Hong Kong League XI in Merdeka Tournament, a friendly tournament in 1957.

After retirement, he coached Republic of China (Taiwan) in 1966 Pestabola Merdeka. He also coached Laos and Hong Kong.

Honours

Republic of China
Asian Games Gold medal: 1954, 1958

References

External links
 

China international footballers
Chinese Taipei international footballers from Hong Kong
1921 births
2012 deaths
Association football forwards
Footballers at the 1948 Summer Olympics
1960 AFC Asian Cup players
Olympic footballers of China
Hong Kong national football team managers
Chinese Taipei national football team managers
Hong Kong football managers
Dual internationalists (football)
Taiwanese footballers
Asian Games medalists in football
Asian Games gold medalists for Chinese Taipei
Footballers at the 1954 Asian Games
Footballers at the 1958 Asian Games
Medalists at the 1954 Asian Games
Medalists at the 1958 Asian Games